The Aomori West Bypass (青森西バイパス Aomori Nishi Bypass) is a major highway located entirely in the city of Aomori in northern Japan. The highway main function is to link the western part of the city to its center. Signed as National Route 7, it connects the main section of National Route 7 to the northern terminus of National Route 4, meeting at Hakko Dori in front of the prefecture office of Aomori. The route also carries National Route 101 to its northern terminus at National Route 4 as well.

Route description

From its western terminus at the mainline of National Route 7, the bypass makes its way east to the middle of Aomori. It first meets with a bypass of National Route 280, then it crosses under the tracks of the Hokkaido Shinkansen near Shin-Aomori Station. It is then carried by the Aomori Viaduct over the Tsugaru Line; this bridge is the third-longest in Aomori Prefecture. The bypass meets the southern terminus of National Route 280 at the east end of the viaduct. It then crosses over the Ōu Main Line and Aoimori Railway Line near Aomori Station meeting its end shortly after at the northern terminus of National Route 4. National Route 4 continues along the same roadway south towards Tokyo.

Major intersections

See also

Notes

References

National highways in Japan
Roads in Aomori Prefecture